Chang Can Dunk is a 2023 American sports-drama film written and directed by Jingyi Shao in his feature length debut, starring Bloom Li, Dexter Darden, Ben Wang, Zoe Renee, Chase Liefeld and Mardy Ma. The film is an underdog coming-of-age story, involving high school basketball and the titular character's determination to overcome expectations.

The film was released on Disney+ on March 10, 2023.

Plot
 Xiao Ming "Bernard" Chang is an unpopular sophomore in high school. He hangs out with his band friend Bo but expresses huge interest in basketball, with whom he shares a rivalry with star player Matt O'Neil, his former friend from elementary school. One day, he meets his new bandmate Kristy and becomes smitten with her, only for Matt to start hitting on her. Chang continues to feel threatened by Matt, especially when his friends lock him in the basement at a house party. He escapes and confronts Matt over a prior basketball game and claims that he can dunk, but Matt puts him down and he's humiliated when he falls into a swimming pool.

Chang continues his quest to reinvent himself, especially since his mother Chen always judges his decisions, leading him to not opening up to her. He finally confronts Matt at school and bets that he can make a dunk by homecoming. Should Chang win, Matt must shave his head and give him his prized Kobe Bryant jersey. Should Matt win, not only must Chang shave his head, but also give him his first edition "shadowless" Charizard Pokémon Trading Card. Kristy knows full well that the bet is really about her, but chooses to support Chang regardless. Bo helps Chang train rigorously, but after a week, feels that he hasn't accomplished much. He goes online and discovers Deandre Cooke, a YouTuber who films himself dunking.

Chang meets Deandre at a Verizon store and Deandrew agrees to take him on as his protégé. Seeing as how they cannot pay him, Bo instead offers to improve his YouTube videos, calling their production terrible. He agrees. Chang improves significantly as Deandre films and uploads his exploits online and the two form a bond. Chang asks Deandre why he never went pro and he says sometimes life just doesn't go the way you want it to. At the same time, Chang and his mother start to feel distant. The day before the dunk, Chang feels that he's still off and sneaks into the school late at night. In the morning, everyone gathers to see Chang's dunk attempt and after large fanfare, succeeds, winning the bet and earning him school fame.

Despite his online recognition, Chen remains in the dark about her son's success. He's invited by ESPN to New York to talk about his win and brings Bo, Kristy and Deandre with him. When he's asked to make the dunk again, he misses, claiming that the wind threw him off. However, Chang is swallowed up by his fame and nearly ditches his friends. At school the next day, Matt says he knew that Chang cheated by lowering the basket on the court. Chang accuses him of racism and they get into a fight, resulting in both boys getting suspended for a week. Chen finally learns what Chang has been up to and angrily tells him that he doesn't need to prove himself to others, while Chang says he can never talk to her because she's always unhappy and makes everyone else unhappy. Chang realizes that he cannot make a dunk and publicly apologizes for his cheating.

Chen confronts Deandre over the time he spent with Chang, but he tells her that he was a great kid whom he truly believes in. Realizing that her son has potential, Chen goes home and destroys her house's unfinished veranda from her separated husband. Chang helps her and repairs their relationship. Chang makes up with Bo and Kristy, the latter of whom he starts dating. He tries out for the school basketball team and makes up with Matt, with both of them becoming better people. Sometime later, Chang is on the basketball team and his coach tells him to enter a game. While he briefly makes a mistake, he steals the ball from an opposing player before dribbling down the court and rising for a dunk. The film ends with the crowd going wild, suggesting that he finally dunked.

Cast

Production

Development
The film was reported in 2019 with a script by Jingyi Shao, the film was ultimately placed on hold and deemed a 2020 The Black List-ed film, which includes screenplays that would not be released in theaters during that calendar year due to the COVID-19 pandemic. By September 2021, it was announced that Shao will also serve as director on the project, while Bloom Li was cast in the titular role. Chase Liefeld joined the cast later that month. Rishi Rajani and Brad Weston serve as producers. On November 4, 2021, it was reported that Dexter Darden and Ben joined the cast.

Filming
Initially announced to begin production in October 2021, principal photography commenced ahead of schedule in September of the same year. Scenes were filmed October 22–23, 2021 at Frank Scott Bunnell High School in Stratford, Connecticut. Filming also took place for a month and a half at Westhill High School in Stamford, Connecticut. By December 2, 2021, filming had wrapped up. In December 2021, Zoe Renee and Mardy Ma were revealed as part of the cast.

Release
Chang Can Dunk was released exclusively as a Disney+ original film on March 10, 2023.

Reception
 On Metacritic, the film has a weighted average score of 77 out of 100 based on reviews from 5 critics, indicating "generally favorable reviews".

References

External links
 
 

2020s English-language films
2020s American films
2023 directorial debut films
American basketball films
American coming-of-age drama films
American sports drama films
American high school films
Asian-American drama films
Disney+ original films
Films shot in Connecticut
Walt Disney Pictures films